Groix is an island and a commune in the Morbihan department of the region of Brittany in north-western France.

Groix lies a few kilometres off the coast of Lorient. Several ferries a day run from Lorient to Groix.

There are a few small towns on the island. High cliffs are on its north coast and sandy beaches in secluded coves on the south coast. Groix is also home to a wide variety of sea birds. Groix is also famous for hosting the only convex beach in Europe, which also moves following sea currents. During the last 15 years, the beach moved half a kilometer westbound.

The geology of Groix is distinct from that of the nearby continent, and the east and south coasts have been designated a mineral nature reserve since 1982. More than 60 minerals can be found on the island, particularly blue glaucophane (observable on the surface), epidote or garnet. The island mainly consists of schist.

A major naval battle between Britain and France took place off Groix in 1795.

Climate

Demographics
Inhabitants of Groix are called Groisillons.

Gallery

See also
Communes of the Morbihan department
Yann-Ber Kalloc'h

References

Bibliography
 "Gildas, the cabin boy from Groix" 2007 by the students of College Saint Tudy-ile de Groix-*

External links
Official site 
Ile de Groix
Groix info
Ile-de-groix.info
Geomorphology of the area

Islands of Brittany
Communes of Morbihan
Islands of the Bay of Biscay